Matbar Singh Kandari is a senior political leader Of Uttrakhand He was cabinet minister in the government  Uttrakhand india

Matbar Singh kandari was made minister in kalyan singh government and Mayawati government when uttar pradesh was undivided

He became leader of opposition during first uttarakhand assembly 

He always supported shri ND Tiwari when he was chief minister of Uttrakhand for fast and flourish development of uttrakhand state

He is one of the senior leaders of Uttarakhand. 

He became MLA from Rudraprayag and karanprayag assembly seats of uttarakhand 

Due to internal politics against him in bjp he 

quit BJP and joined congress for better development of state 

Public of Rudraprayag assembly is in favor of shri matbar Singh kandari and seeing him as his upcoming MLA in 2022

References

Living people
Leaders of the Opposition in Uttarakhand
Bharatiya Janata Party politicians from Uttarakhand
Irrigation Ministers of Uttarakhand
Year of birth missing (living people)